The south-central black rhinoceros (Diceros bicornis minor), also known as the south-central hook-lipped rhinoceros or the lesser black rhino, is a subspecies of the black rhinoceros. In keeping with the rules of zoological nomenclature, the south-central black rhinoceros should be known as Diceros bicornis keitloa (Smith, 1836), a nomen novum.
Although it is the most numerous of the black rhino subspecies, it is nevertheless  designated as critically endangered on the IUCN’s red list. Like other black rhino subspecies, it has a prehensile lip and lives in savanna habitat.

Range

The south-central black rhinoceros once ranged from western and southern Tanzania, through Malawi, Zambia, Zimbabwe, and Mozambique, all the way to northern and eastern South Africa. It is also thought to have inhabited the southern part of the Democratic Republic of the Congo, as well as northern Angola and eastern Botswana. Today, however, its population stronghold is in northeastern South Africa, and to a lesser extent in Zimbabwe, with even smaller numbers in Eswatini. At one time, the south-central black rhino had disappeared from Malawi, Botswana, and Zambia, but it has since been reintroduced into those countries. Whether there are any in Mozambique is uncertain, but at least one specimen has been seen there since 2008.

Population and threats 
Over the last 50 years, the south-central black rhino population has declined by 90%.  It was at 9,090 in 1980, but by 1995, due to a wave of illegal poaching for their horns, their numbers had decreased to 1,300. Their population then began to rebound somewhat. By 2001, it had increased to 1,651, and by 2010 it was about 2,200 (with 1,684 of these in South Africa, 431 in Zimbabwe, and a few specimens in other countries). At present the number is increasing overall, but decreasing regionally (in Zimbabwe). The main threat to the subspecies is illegal poaching, which has increased in recent years.

Notes

External links 
 International Rhino Fund dedicated to the conservation of rhinos

Rhinoceroses
Mammals of South Africa
Mammals of Zimbabwe
Mammals of Botswana
Mammals of Angola
Mammals of Zambia
Critically endangered fauna of Africa
Mammals described in 1876